Graham Keith Harbey (born 29 August 1964) was a footballer who played in the Football League for Derby County, Ipswich Town, Stoke City and West Bromwich Albion.

Career
Harbey was born in Chesterfield and progressed through the youth teams at Derby County and made his debut in 1983–84. He played 21 times for the "Rams" that season as they suffered relegation from the Second Division. In the third tier Harbey most of his time in the reserves and Derby gain promotion in 1985–86. He played 19 times in 1986–87 as back to back promotions were achieved but Harbey deemed surplus to requirements was sold to Ipswich Town. He spent two years at Portman Road making 77 appearances and was sold to West Bromwich Albion in November 1989. He played three seasons for the "Baggies" and was an ever-present in 1991–92 making 53 appearances. He joined Stoke City in the summer of 1992 and made 24 appearances in 1992–93 as Stoke won the third tier title. He was rarely used by manager Lou Macari in 1993–94 and left the club at the end of the season.

Career statistics
Source:

A.  The "Other" column constitutes appearances and goals in the Anglo-Italian Cup, Full Members Cup, Football League Trophy.

Honours
 Derby County
 Football League Second Division champions: 1986–87
 Football League Third Division third-place promotion: 1985–86

 Stoke City
 Football League Second Division champions: 1992–93

References

1964 births
Living people
Footballers from Chesterfield
Association football defenders
English footballers
Stoke City F.C. players
West Bromwich Albion F.C. players
Ipswich Town F.C. players
Derby County F.C. players
Gresley F.C. players
English Football League players